John Cosgrove (September 12, 1839 – August 15, 1925) was a Democratic Representative from Missouri's 6th congressional district.  He served from March 4, 1883 – March 4, 1885.

Cosgrove was born near Alexandria Bay in Jefferson County, New York on September 12, 1839.  He attended schools in Redwood, New York, and then traveled in the western United States, where his activities included mining for gold.  He later taught school, studied law in Watertown, New York, and was admitted to the bar in 1863.

During the American Civil War Cosgrove was rejected for military service after he failed his physical exam, but he joined a unit of the National Guard.  he attained the rank of first lieutenant, and served on the Canada–US border during the increased security measures which followed the Confederate attack in Vermont that came to be called the St. Albans Raid.

Cosgrove moved to Boonville, Missouri in 1865 and was Boonville city attorney from 1870 to 1871 and prosecuting attorney of Cooper County, Missouri in 1872.  He served as a delegate to the Democratic National Conventions in 1872.

He was twice more city attorney of Boonville, first from April 1877 to April 1878, and then from April 1879 to April 1881.

Cosgrove was elected as a Democrat to the Forty-eighth Congress (March 4, 1883 – March 4, 1885).  He was renominated in 1884, but withdrew before election day.

After leaving Congress Cosgrove resumed the practice of law in Boonville.  He served on the local school board for several years, and was a delegate to the 1920 Democratic National Convention.

Cosgrove died in Boonville on August 15, 1925.  He was buried at Walnut Grove Cemetery in Boonville.

References

1839 births
1925 deaths
People from Jefferson County, New York
People from Boonville, Missouri
Missouri lawyers
Democratic Party members of the United States House of Representatives from Missouri
19th-century American lawyers